Posterior scrotal branches can refer to:
 Posterior scrotal nerves
 Posterior scrotal branches of the internal pudendal artery